Snakes in Suits: When Psychopaths Go to Work is a 2006 non-fiction book by industrial psychologist Paul Babiak and criminal psychologist Robert D. Hare.

Contents summary
The text covers the nature of psychopaths in the context of employment and purports to explain how psychopaths manipulate their way into work and get promoted, the effects of their presence on colleagues and corporations, and the superficial similarities (and fundamental differences) between leadership skills and psychopathic traits. The work is interlaced with fictional narratives illustrating how the factual content applies to real-life situations. Characteristics of manipulators are described as shifting to meet stereotypical gender expectations: a female psychopath might make full use of the passive, warm, nurturing, and dependent gender role stereotype in order to get what she wants out of others and a male psychopath might use a macho image, intimidation, and aggression to achieve satisfaction of his desires. The authors posit that around 1% of senior positions in business are occupied by psychopaths.

The authors describe a "five phase model" of how a typical workplace psychopath climbs to and maintains power: entry, assessment, manipulation, confrontation, and ascension. In the entry stage, the psychopath will use highly developed social skills and charm to obtain employment in an organisation. At this stage it will be difficult to spot anything which is indicative of psychopathic behaviour, and as a new employee you might perceive the psychopath to be helpful and even benevolent. Once on to the assessment stage, the psychopath will weigh you up according to your usefulness, and you could be recognised as either a pawn (who has some informal influence and will be easily manipulated) or a patron (who has formal power and will be used by the psychopath to protect against attacks).

Manipulation involves the psychopath creating a scenario of “psychopathic fiction” where positive information about themselves and negative disinformation about others will be created, where your role as a part of a network of pawns or patrons will be utilised and you will be groomed into accepting the psychopath's agenda. Once on to the confrontation stage, the psychopath will use techniques of character assassination to maintain their agenda, and you will be either discarded as a pawn or used as a patron. Finally, in the ascension stage, the role of the subject as a patron in the psychopath’s quest for power will be discarded, and the psychopath will take for himself/herself a position of power and prestige from anyone who once supported them.

Reception
A review of Snakes in Suits by The Australian called it "a lay guide to corporate psychopaths" and concluded that "However wooden in parts, Snakes in Suits is a valuable addition to any business library."

Snakes in Suits has also been reviewed by Publishers Weekly, Booklist, Psychology Today, California Bookwatch, Security Management, Canadian Business, and Finweek.

See also
 The Mask of Sanity – by Hervey M. Cleckley, first published in 1941
 Without Conscience: The Disturbing World of the Psychopaths Among Us – by Robert D. Hare, first published in 1993
 Evil Genes – by  Barbara Oakley, published in 2007
 The Psychopath Test – by Jon Ronson, published in 2011

References

External links
The Disturbing Link Between Psychopathy And Leadership, Forbes magazine, 2013
‘Snakes in Suits’ unmasks corporate psychos Today 5 Jun 2006 
 Hill-Tout J The psychopaths in suits BBC 14 Jan 2004

2006 non-fiction books
Books about psychopathy
Business books
Human resource management books
Industrial and organizational psychology
Workplace bullying
Popular psychology books